McMahon Glacier is a glacier about  long in the Anare Mountains of Victoria Land, Antarctica. It drains north between the Buskirk Bluffs and Gregory Bluffs into Nielsen Fjord. The glacier was named by the Antarctic Names Committee of Australia for F.P. McMahon, Logistics Officer with the Australian Antarctic Division, who led a number of expeditions to Macquarie Island and was second-in-charge of several expeditions to Antarctica.

References

Glaciers of Pennell Coast